The Liguilla will have the teams play two games against each other on a home-and-away basis. The winner of each match up will be determined by aggregate score. the higher seeded team will advance if the aggregate is a tie. The exception for tie-breaking procedure is the finals, where the higher seeded team rule will not be used. If the teams remained tied after 90 minutes of play during the 2nd leg of the finals, extra time will be used, followed by a penalty shootout if necessary. The teams will be seeded 1 to 8 (depending on their position at the end of the regular season). Higher seeded teams play on their home field during the second leg.

Kickoffs are given in local time.

Bracket

Quarter-finals
The quarterfinals are scheduled to be played on May 13, 14, 16, and 17.

|}

First leg

Second leg

Semi-finals
The semifinals are scheduled to be played on May 20, 21, 23, and 24.

|}

First leg

Second leg

UNAM tied 3–3 on aggregate and advance as the higher seeded team.

Final

|}

First leg

Second leg

References

Clau
2009 domestic association football leagues